Kelchie Arizmendi (born Kelchie Arizmendi Castellanos on March 6, 1977, in Mexico City, Mexico) is a Mexican actress. In 1998 debut as Panchita in the telenovela Vivo por Elena.

Biography 
Arizmendi was born on March 6, 1977, in Mexico City, Mexico. At 18 years old, begin her career as an actress and entering CEA (Centro de Educación Artística de Televisa), where on the basis of effort manages to graduate with successful actors and actresses with Claudia Troyo, Adriana Nieto, Susana González, Arleth Terán and Miguel Ángel Biago. His television debut was at age 21 in a production of Juan Osorio as part of the youth cast in the telenovela Vivo por Elena.

Filmography

Theatre
Panal Gastronómico (2006/07)
Stand bY Comedy (2013/14)
Se busca el hombre de mi vida, porque marido ya tuve (2013/16)
Amoratados (2015)
Suicidame mi Amor (2017)

References

External links 
 

1977 births
Living people
Mexican telenovela actresses
Mexican television actresses
Mexican stage actresses
Actresses from Mexico City
20th-century Mexican actresses
21st-century Mexican actresses